Bosede Bukola Afolabi is a UK-born Nigerian Gynaecologist, Professor, and Head of the Department of Obstetrics and Gynaecology at the College of Medicine, Lagos University Teaching Hospital, Lagos, Nigeria. She is also the founder and chairperson of MRH (Maternal and Reproductive Health) Research Collective, a research and training NGO.

Education and training 
Bosede Afolabi graduated from Obafemi Awolowo University, Ile-Ife, in 1992. She proceeded to the University of Nottingham, U.K., where she was awarded a tuition scholarship to pursue a Doctor of Medicine (DM) degree part-time. Her primary research entitled Plasma volume in normal and sickle cell pregnancies was accepted. She earned a DM in Obstetrics and Gynaecology from the University of Nottingham in June 2011.

She is a medical educator with a diploma from the Foundation for the Advancement of International Medical Education and Research, USA. In 2016, she obtained a Certificate in Biostatistics and Epidemiology from the Harvard T.Chan School of Public Health in Boston, U.S.A.

Career 
Bosede served as Senior House Officer (SHO) in Obstetrics and Gynaecology at Central Middlesex Hospital, London, and Hull Royal Infirmary, North Yorkshire, and SHO and Specialist Registrar in many UK Hospitals, before returning to Lagos, Nigeria in 1998.

Bosede became a Senior Registrar for the Obstetrics and Gynecology Department at Lagos University Teaching Hospital in 2000 and later became a Consultant Obstetrician and Gynecologist in 2002, where she continues to serve until the present day. In addition, she joined the College of Medicine at the University of Lagos as a Lecturer II; she progressed through several promotions until 2016 when she became a professor of Obstetrics and Gynaecology. In 2018, she became the Head of the Department of Obstetrics and Gynaecology at the Lagos University Teaching Hospital (LUTH), a position she held until July 2021. In August 2022, she was reappointed to this position.

She is an executive director at MRH (Maternal and Reproductive Health) Research Collective and a board member of several institutions such as the Ekiti State University Teaching Hospital and the Kensington Adebukola Adebutu Foundation (KAAF), Laboratory and Maternity Centre.

She was featured on CNN African Voices for her work in sickle cell pregnancy and her teaching, research, and clinical outcome in obstetrics and efforts to reduce maternal mortality. In addition, she has been featured on several platforms such as CNN, Arise TV, The Conversation, BBC, Daily Trust, The Punch, BellaNaija, Medical World Nigeria, Woman.ng, World Economic Forum and Quartz Africa.

Publications 
Bosede has authored more than 102 peer-reviewed publications focusing on Maternal medicine and Safe delivery, including sickle cell pregnancy. From October 2019 to June 2022, she served as the Assistant Editor of the Journal of the West African College of Surgeons. In June 2022, she became the Editor in Chief and occupied the position until December 2022. She is a PhD examiner of the Pan African University of Life and Earth Sciences. She has collaborated with various international academics, including researchers from the Universities of Nottingham and Greenwich, UK, Institute of Tropical Medicine, Belgium, London School of Economics, and Harvard School of Public Health, USA.

Scholarship and grants 
Bosede's research focuses on improving maternal health. She founded the Maternal and Reproductive Health Research Collective, a research and training NGO established to reduce the rate of pregnancy-related illness and death and improve the reproductive health of Nigerian women, through research, advocacy, and training programs.

In 2011, she presented a course on Malaria in pregnancy, prevention, and treatment at various seminars to bring light to a prevalent issue in this region. She also presented her paper on Sickle cell disease and the renin-angiotensin-aldosterone system during the Valedictory Scientific meeting for Professor Fiona Broughton Pipkin at Queen's Medical Centre, Nottingham. Bosede continues to reinforce her passion for childbearing, sickle cell and maternal mortality, which reflects in her many publications, interviews, and research articles on the topic. She is a member of the Sickle Cell Foundation of Nigeria.

These have formed the basis for various grants, fellowships, scholarships, and accolades from multiple bodies. Bosede is the principal investigator on a Bill and Melinda Gates Foundation grant for the IVON trial (Intravenous versus oral iron for iron deficiency anaemia in pregnant Nigerian women: a randomized controlled trial) as well as Country Principal Investigator on a grant for a study titled Preparedness and response to COVID-19: a global survey of maternal care providers - In-depth case study of large referral maternity wards in four countries in sub-Saharan Africa.

Honours 
In 2021, Bosede was awarded a Special Recognition Award by the Physician of The Year Award Committee for her Commitment and Dedication. In November 2022, she received the "Excellence in Research" award from the Society of Obstetricians and Gynaecologists of Nigeria (SOGON). In addition, she served as the Ojo Memorial Lecturer at SOGON's 56th Annual Scientific Conference.

References

Living people
Women gynaecologists
Nigerian obstetricians
Nigerian gynaecologists
Nigerian women medical doctors
Academic staff of the University of Lagos
Obafemi Awolowo University alumni
Year of birth missing (living people)